Adrian Mannarino was the defending champion but decided not to participate.

Denis Istomin won his third Challenger title in this year. He defeated Philipp Kohlschreiber 7–6(8–6), 6–4 in the final.

Seeds

Draw

Finals

Top half

Bottom half

References
 Main Draw
 Qualifying Draw

American Express - TED Open - Singles
PTT İstanbul Cup